Sky Kids is a British pay television channel carrying preschool and children's programmes. 

Owned by the Sky Group, a subsidiary of Comcast, it is the first in-house children's network to be programmed and directly operated by Sky. Sky Kids launched on 13 February 2023.

History 
The concept of a Sky-branded children's television channel was first proposed in 1986 as part of Rupert Murdoch's bid for the national direct broadcast satellite franchise, won British Satellite Broadcasting (BSB and Sky plc would merge in 1990 into British Sky Broadcasting). The Children's Channel eventually was taken up by the platform, and after a failed attempt to acquire a half-stake in TCC, Sky launched Fox Kids in 1996, a stake eventually reduced over time and completely bought out in 2009 by The Walt Disney Company, by which time it was known as Disney XD. Sky also held a 40% stake in Nickelodeon UK Ltd. and carried the Nickelodeon suite of children's networks from launch in 1993; MTV Networks International held the majority 60% stake.

Prior to the launch of Sky Kids, a Sky Kids Magazine was briefly available for subscribers of Sky Magazine. A Sky Kids app was launched in 2016 featuring On Demand content specifically for children, for Sky customers. 

On 31 October 2022, Sky sold their full stake in Nickelodeon UK Ltd. to Paramount Networks UK & Australia; the Nickelodeon agreement had contained a non-compete clause that otherwise restricted Sky and Comcast from launching a children's television network while still holding a stake in Nickelodeon UK Ltd.

On 22 November 2022, Sky UK announced the launch of a linear and advertising-free Sky Kids channel some time in February 2023.

Availability

Cable
Virgin Media : Channel 707 (HD)

Satellite
Sky  and Sky : Channel 609 (HD)

Terrestrial
BT : Channel 472 (SD) & Channel 477 (HD)

Programming 
Original programmes for the channel announced at launch include My Friend Misty, a series executive produced by Fearne Cotton, and Ready, Eddie, Go! These are complemented by acquired programmes including Trolls: TrollsTopia, Where's Wally, and Madagascar: A Little Wild, and existing content commissioned for Sky such as MC Grammar: Wonder Raps and The Brilliant World of Tom Gates.

Current programming

Preschool
 123 Number Squad!
 64 Zoo Lane
 Ama’s Story
 Awesome Animals and Mini Me
 Beep and Mort
 Big Block SingSong
 BooSnoo!
 Blippi
 Clifford the Big Red Dog (2019 TV series)
 Cosmic Kids Yoga Adventures
 Dino Club
 Dreamflight
 Gecko's Garage
 Go Buster
 Happy Dance
 In The Night Garden Specials
 Labuntina
 Lellobee City Farm
 Mia's Magic Playground
 Mini Kids
 MC Grammar: Wonder Raps
 Miffy's Adventures Big and Small
 Mittens & Pants
 Norman Picklestripes
 Pip and Posy
 Playdate
 The Polos
 Pirates Love Underpants
 Ryan's World Specials
 Snowsnaps
The Sharksons
 The Very Small Creatures
 Where's Wally?
 Zoonicorn

Kids
 Abominable and the Invisible City
 Critters TV
 Care Bears: Unlock the Music
 The Brilliant World of Tom Gates
 Draw with Will
 The Epic Adventures of Morph
 The Makery
 Moominvalley
 Obki
 Pooch Mooch
 Silly Pets
 Supa Strikas
 Trolls: TrollsTopia

Notes

References 

2023 establishments in the United Kingdom
Children's television channels in the United Kingdom
Children's television networks
English-language television stations in the United Kingdom
Sky Group
Preschool education television networks
Television channels and stations established in 2023
Television channels in the United Kingdom
Universal Kids